Casey Martin (born June 2, 1972) is an American professional golfer and the current men's golf head coach at the University of Oregon.

Early life
Martin was born in Eugene, Oregon and still resides there. He was educated at Stanford University, where he was initiated into the Sigma Chi fraternity and was briefly a teammate of Tiger Woods. He was a three-time all Pac-10 and was a member of the University's NCAA Championship team in 1994. He won the 1993 Sahalee Players Championship, and turned professional in 1995.

Professional golf career
In 1998, he won a Nike Tour (later named the Buy.com Tour, Nationwide Tour, Web.com Tour, and now Korn Ferry Tour) event, the Lakeland Classic, in a playoff, thus assuring himself of remaining on the tour the following year and securing a five-year exemption from the first round of Qualifying School (Q-School). Also in 1998, he attained a career highlight by finishing tied for 23rd at the U.S. Open, and briefly contending for the lead before falling back.

In late 1999, by finishing 14th on the Nike Tour money list, Martin secured a spot on the PGA Tour. He finished 179th on the money list in 2000 and failed to keep his card through his earnings on the PGA Tour. As a PGA Tour cardholder for 2000, he began at the final stage of that year's Q-School, but narrowly failed to keep his spot (finishing tied for 37th, when the top 35 and ties qualified), relegating him to the Buy.com Tour.

Martin kept full status on the Nike Tour through 2003, but failed to make the Q-School finals in 2003, relegating him to a limited status in 2004, a year in which he played nine tournaments. In 2004, following the expiration of his five-year exemption from the first round of Q-School, he advanced from the first to the second of the three rounds but no further, and only had limited status in 2005, playing nine tournaments on the tour and making two cuts.  He played five events in 2006, making the cut once, for a total earnings of $1,328.

On June 4, 2012, Martin qualified for the 2012 U.S. Open, winning a sectional at Emerald Valley Golf Club.

Coaching career
In May 2006, Martin was named head coach of the University of Oregon's men's golf team in his hometown of Eugene, after working as a volunteer assistant during the 2006 season. He has indicated he hopes to continue to play, where it fits in with his coaching schedule. However, he did not play any professional events or attempt Q-School in 2007 or 2008. Oregon won the 2016 NCAA Division I Men's Golf Championship.

Personal life
Martin suffers from a birth defect in his right leg known as Klippel–Trénaunay syndrome. In PGA Tour, Inc. v. Martin, Martin successfully sued the PGA Tour in 2001 for the right to use a golf cart during competition under the Americans with Disabilities Act. During the years that the suit wound through the courts, he enjoyed limited success on the golf course, and throughout, was permitted to use a golf cart.

In October 2019, while attempting to retrieve a garbage can from the street he lived on, he misjudged a step between the street, which was under construction, and his curb, breaking his defective leg. He took a medical leave from coaching during the Ducks' fall 2019 golf schedule, with assistant Brad Lanning taking over until he returned to campus for the spring season (which was ultimately shortened due to the coronavirus pandemic). Because his condition has prevented his fracture from properly healing, he has used crutches since returning to campus.

In a March 2020 interview with The Register-Guard, the daily newspaper for Oregon's home of Eugene, Martin said about the prospect of losing his leg, "I was grateful that I was able to hold it off for a long time. I thought it would happen at 27 not 47. But it has happened. I’m just going to do everything in my power to save my leg." He added that he had considered an amputation, recognizing that a prosthesis would enable him to walk without pain, but noted, "If I lose my leg, it would be an above-the-knee deal, and it’s pretty risky for my situation anyway. It’s something that I’ve recognized could happen, but I would really rather not, if I could save it, because of the risks." At the time of the interview, Martin was scheduled to travel to Washington state to be fitted for a special carbon-fiber leg brace that could potentially redirect his body weight in a way that would allow the fracture to heal.

In October 2021, Martin underwent successful surgery to amputate his right leg.  His doctors believed that the surgery went well enough to allow him the future use of a prosthesis.

Professional wins (1)

Nike Tour wins (1)

Nike Tour playoff record (0–1)

Results in major championships

CUT = missed the half-way cut
"T" = tied
Note: Casey only played in the U.S. Open.

Web.com Tour results

PGA Tour results

See also
1999 Nike Tour graduates

References

External links

Casey Martin Bio at University of Oregon Athletics site

American male golfers
Oregon Ducks men's golf coaches
Stanford Cardinal men's golfers
PGA Tour golfers
Korn Ferry Tour graduates
Golfers from Oregon
American amputees
Sportspeople from Eugene, Oregon
1972 births
Living people